Klara Svensson (born 15 October 1987) is a Swedish professional boxer. She held the WBC interim light-welterweight title from 2014 to 2015, the WBC interim welterweight title from September 2016 to February 2017, and challenged for the undisputed welterweight title in the same month. As an amateur she is a five-time Swedish national champion, a two-time medallist at the European Championships and a three-time medallist at the World Championships, all in the light-welterweight division.

Early life and amateur career
Svensson was born and raised in Höllviken, south of Malmö. She was regarded as one of the best and most promising young Swedish boxers thanks to her successful amateur career, during which she won a medal in every World Championship event in which she participated. At the 2006 World Championships she won a silver medal, which was followed by bronze at both the 2008 and 2010 events. She also won bronze and silver at the 2006 and 2007 European Championships, respectively.

Professional career
Svensson is currently signed to Sauerland Promotion, and is trained by former professional boxer Joey Gamache in Copenhagen. She made her professional debut on 11 June 2011, winning a four-round unanimous decision (UD) over Andrea Rotaru, who also debuted. In her sixth fight, on 22 February 2013, Svensson won the vacant WBC Silver super-lightweight title by defeating Floarea Lihet via ten-round UD. Svensson scored six wins in 2013, and on 13 September 2014 would win the WBC interim super-lightweight title in a UD over Marie Riederer. One defence of the title was made, in a UD against Lucia Morelli on 29 November 2014. This subsequently earned Svensson an opportunity to fight for the full WBC female super-lightweight title, held by Erica Farias. Svensson lost the bout by UD, which took place on 2 May 2015, and was also knocked down by Farias in the fifth round.

Professional boxing record

References

External links
 at Sauerland Promotion

Swedish women boxers
Living people
1987 births
Sportspeople from Malmö
AIBA Women's World Boxing Championships medalists
Lightweight boxers
Light-welterweight boxers
Welterweight boxers